Kimmo Kristian Latvamäki (born June 6, 1976 in Ruovesi) is a Finnish sprint canoer who competed in the early to mid-2000s. At the 2000 Summer Olympics in Sydney, he was eliminated in the semifinals of the K-1 500 m event. Four years later in Athens, Latvamäki was eliminated in the semifinals of the same event.

References
 Sports-Reference.com profile

1976 births
Living people
People from Ruovesi
Canoeists at the 2000 Summer Olympics
Canoeists at the 2004 Summer Olympics
Finnish male canoeists
Olympic canoeists of Finland
Sportspeople from Pirkanmaa